Neston Hockey Club is a field hockey club that is based at Parkgate in South Wirral, Cheshire. Founded in 1963 the team became National Champions of England in 1984.

Major National honours
 1978–79 Men's Cup Runner-up
 1982–83 Men's Cup winners
 1983–84 Men's League champions
 England Hockey Ladies Hockey Team of the Year 2014

Teams

The club runs eight men's teams and five women's teams  and the Mens 1s and Ladies 1s compete in the North Premier Hockey League, as of 2020/21 season.

The Facilities 

The Club also offers 12 tennis courts, two cricket pitches and three squash courts. Three function rooms each with its own bar, the Club has a very busy events side to it, The Parkgate Clubhouse hosts weddings, conferences, parties and other events.

International players
Bobby Crutchley
Robbie Smith
Mal Wilkinson
Chris Ashcroft
David Peters
Geoff Poole
Paul Edwards
David Cutter
Justin Pidcock
Donald Hughes
Martyn Grimley
Izzie Howell

References

English field hockey clubs
Sport in Cheshire